is a private junior college in Toyama, Toyama, Japan. It is attached to the Kureha Campus of Toyama University of International Studies. The school was founded as a women's junior college called Toyama Women's College in 1963. In 2000 it became coeducational.

See also
 Toyama National College of Technology
 Toyama National College of Maritime Technology

External links
 Official website 

Educational institutions established in 1963
Private universities and colleges in Japan
Universities and colleges in Toyama Prefecture
1963 establishments in Japan
Japanese junior colleges
Toyama (city)